Vera Zvonareva was the two-time defending champion, but lost to Daniela Hantuchová in the semifinals. Daniela Hantuchová won the title, defeating Sara Errani 6-0, 6-2 in the final.

Seeds

Qualifying

Draw

Finals

Top half

Bottom half

External links
Main Draw
Qualifying Draw

Singles
PTT Pattaya Open - Singles
 in women's tennis